Scotland Tonight is a Scottish news and current affairs programme, covering the two STV franchise areas of Northern and Central Scotland, produced by STV News. The programme is presented by STV News at Six Central anchor John MacKay on Mondays & Tuesdays and former Sky News Scotland correspondent Rona Dougall on Wednesdays & Thursday.

Details
The half-hour programme, which launched on Monday 24 October 2011, replacing the former STV weekly-political programme Politics Now. Scotland Tonight airs at 22:40 on Monday – Wednesday nights following the late bulletin from STV News; the Thursday edition has aired in a prime-time 19:30 slot since January 2020. The programme features reports, interviews & analysis on the Scottish national news of the day alongside coverage of politics, business, sport and the arts & entertainment. In January 2022, it was announced that the Thursday edition would move one hour later to 20:30 from March 2022, due to other changes to STV's evening schedules.

Scotland Tonight is broadcast across both STV regions (North & Central). The programme is broadcast from studio 1 at STV's Glasgow studios, sharing the studio with the West edition of STV News at Six.

Gordon Chree, Colin Mackay, Aasmah Mir, Halla Mohieddeen, Bernard Ponsonby, Claire Stewart and Kelly Ann Woodland have each presented on occasion.

Specials
 Rangers – The Downfall: 14 June 2012
 Independence Referendum: Edinburgh Agreement: 15 October 2012
 Referendum Debate: Nicola Sturgeon vs Michael Moore: 16 May 2013
 Referendum Debate: Nicola Sturgeon vs Anas Sarwar:  5 September 2013
 Referendum Debate: Nicola Sturgeon vs Alistair Carmichael:  27 November 2013
 Referendum Interactive Debate: 29 November 2013
 2013 Glasgow helicopter crash: 2 December 2013
 Referendum Debate: Nicola Sturgeon vs Johann Lamont: 25 February 2014
 Europe Special: 2 April 2014, live from Brussels.
 Death of Margo MacDonald: Friday 4 April 2014
 Salmond & Darling: The Debate (reaction and analysis): Tuesday 5 August 2014
 UK 2015 general election (reaction and analysis): Friday 8 May 2015
 Europe Special: 25 June 2015, live from Brussels.
 5th Birthday Special: 24 October 2016.

Special extend programmes are also held for any Scottish By-election, usually presented by Bernard Ponsonby.

References

External links
 

2010s Scottish television series
2020s Scottish television series
2011 Scottish television series debuts
Arts in Scotland
Entertainment in Scotland
ITV regional news shows
Politics of Scotland
Scottish television news shows
Sport in Scotland
 2
STV News